Before the Acts of Union 1707, the barons of the shire of Fife elected commissioners to represent them in the Parliament of Scotland and in the Convention of the Estates. The number of commissioners was increased from two to four in 1690.

After 1708, Fife was represented by one Member of Parliament in the British House of Commons at Westminster.

List of shire commissioners
 1593: Myreton of Cambo
 1600: Kynynmound of Craigie Hall
 1607, 1608, 1609: Sir Andrew Murray of Balvaird

During the Commonwealth of England, Scotland and Ireland, the sheriffdoms of Fife and Kinross were jointly represented by one Member of Parliament in the Protectorate Parliament at Westminster. After the Restoration, the Parliament of Scotland was again summoned to meet in Edinburgh.

References

Constituencies of the Parliament of Scotland (to 1707)
History of Fife
Politics of Fife
Constituencies disestablished in 1707
1707 disestablishments in Scotland